Rowland Wright Davenport Hill (5 September 1851 – 29 August 1912) was an English cricketer active in 1871 who played for Lancashire. He was born in Hajepoor, India and died in Sydney. He appeared in one first-class match as a righthanded batsman, scoring eight runs with a highest score of 5 and held one catch. He changed his name to Rowland Wright Davenport-Hill in 1877.

Notes

1851 births
1912 deaths
English cricketers
Lancashire cricketers